Yovanny Arrechea (born 23 January 1983) is an American Colombian football striker. He currently is under contract with Club León, but he was not registered to play for the new season since the club had already hit the league limit of five foreign players.

Career
Born in the city of Santander de Quilichao, Cauca in Colombia, Arrechea was a graduate of América de Cali's youth system. He went on loan to second division side Real Cartagena in 2004. After scoring 20 goals in 30 matches, Arrechea returned to América. Spells with Deportivo Pasto, Club Santa Fe, Millonarios and Atlético Nacional followed, and then he moved to China to join Changchun Yatai in 2011. Arrechea also had a spell with Liga MX side Club León before returning to Colombia to play for Santa Fe in the Liga Postobón. Since 2014 he was transferred to Once Caldas club.

Statistics (Official games/Colombian Ligue and Colombian Cup)
(As of November 14, 2010)

References

External links

1983 births
Living people
Colombian footballers
Real Cartagena footballers
América de Cali footballers
Rosario Central footballers
Deportivo Pasto footballers
Independiente Santa Fe footballers
Millonarios F.C. players
Changchun Yatai F.C. players
Shenyang Dongjin players
Club León footballers
Once Caldas footballers
Categoría Primera A players
Categoría Primera B players
Liga MX players
Colombia international footballers
Colombian expatriate footballers
Expatriate footballers in Argentina
Expatriate footballers in China
Colombian expatriate sportspeople in China
Expatriate footballers in Mexico
Chinese Super League players
China League One players
Association football forwards
Sportspeople from Cauca Department